Jefferson Airplane was an American psychedelic rock band from San Francisco, California. Formed in 1965, the group originally featured vocalist and rhythm guitarist Marty Balin, vocalist Signe Toly Anderson, lead guitarist and vocalist Jorma Kaukonen, rhythm guitarist and vocalist Paul Kantner, bassist Bob Harvey and drummer Jerry Peloquin. The band's 1966 to 1970 lineup of Balin, Kaukonen, Kantner, vocalist and keyboardist Grace Slick, bassist Jack Casady and drummer Spencer Dryden were inducted into the Rock and Roll Hall of Fame in 1996. Jefferson Airplane was active through 1972, after which Kaukonen and Casady departed to focus on their side project Hot Tuna and the remaining members eventually took on new members and reorganized as Jefferson Starship.

In 1989, Jefferson Airplane reformed for an album and tour, with Slick, Balin, Kaukonen, Kantner and Casady joined by session/touring musicians. A second reformation followed at the band's Rock and Roll Hall of Fame induction in 1996.

History
Jefferson Airplane was formed in mid-1965 by vocalist and guitarist Marty Balin. He selected rhythm guitarist and vocalist Paul Kantner,  to join the band, the two men then recruited the remaining initial members: vocalist Signe Toly Anderson, lead guitarist and vocalist Jorma Kaukonen, double bassist Bob Harvey and drummer Jerry Peloquin. Peloquin left a few weeks after the band's formation following an altercation with Kantner, with Alexander "Skip" Spence taking his place. Before the end of the year, Harvey was also fired and replaced by Jack Casady, who played electric bass, which was preferred by the band instead of double bass. Spence and Anderson both left in 1966 after the recording of Jefferson Airplane Takes Off, with Spence replaced by Spencer Dryden in May, and Anderson replaced by Grace Slick in October.

With Slick and Dryden, the lineup of Jefferson Airplane remained stable for more than three years, releasing a string of commercially successful albums. The roster remained stable until February 1970, when Dryden left Jefferson Airplane. Changing power dynamics within the group and the murder of Meredith Hunter at the Altamont Free Concert in 1969 led him to become increasingly dissatisfied, and after threatened to leave the band on numerous occasions, the rest of the members eventually decided to dismiss him.

Dryden was replaced by Joey Covington, a bandmate of Kaukonen, Kantner, and Casady in Hot Tuna, who had previously performed percussion on the band's 1969 album Volunteers. In October 1970, violinist Papa John Creach (who had also performed with Hot Tuna) was added to the group's lineup. After continuing to tour throughout 1970, founding member Balin left Jefferson Airplane in April 1971 due to "long-standing ego clashes" with Kantner and Slick, as well as differing lifestyle choices and the death of Janis Joplin, which he explains "struck [him]".

Covington left after recording two songs during the sessions of Long John Silver in April 1972, with John Barbata replacing him for the rest of the recording and then staying on afterwards. David Freiberg, formerly of Quicksilver Messenger Service, joined the band for the album's promotional touring cycle as a replacement for Balin. Jefferson Airplane performed its final show on the Long John Silver tour on September 22, 1972, which ultimately proved to be the final performance of Jefferson Airplane's original tenure despite there being no formal announcement to that effect. Kaukonen and Casady returned to performing with Hot Tuna full time, while the remaining five members (Kantner, Slick, Freiberg, Barbata and Creach), would add new members and regroup under the name Jefferson Starship in January 1974.

Jefferson Airplane returned in 1989 with a self-titled album featuring Balin, Kaukonen, Kantner, Casady and Slick, along with drummer Kenny Aronoff and several additional guest contributors. The band toured in promotion of the release with keyboardist Tim Gorman and guitarists Randy Jackson and Peter Kaukonen (Jorma's brother). A second reunion followed in early 1996 when the band was inducted into the Rock and Roll Hall of Fame, with Balin, Kaukonen, Kantner, Casady and Dryden performing together for the first time since 1970; Slick was unable to attend the performance due to a foot injury which prevented her from traveling.

Several members have since died – Papa John Creach on February 22, 1994, Skip Spence on April 16, 1999, Spencer Dryden on January 11, 2005, Joey Covington on June 4, 2013, Signe Toly Anderson and Paul Kantner on January 28, 2016, and Marty Balin on September 27, 2018.

Members

Timelines

Members
Original tenure

Reunions

Recordings

Lineups
A list of the different lineups of Jefferson Airplane with membership changes in each subsequent entry in bold.

See also
List of Jefferson Starship members
List of Starship members

References

External links
Jefferson Airplane official website

Jefferson Airplane